Abbeydale may refer to:

Canada
 Abbeydale, Calgary, a neighbourhood in Calgary, Canada

United Kingdom 
 Abbeydale, Gloucestershire
 Abbeydale, South Yorkshire
 Abbeydale, Worcestershire, a district of Redditch

Other
 Abbeydale Industrial Hamlet, an industrial museum in the City of Sheffield, England